Geet may refer to:

Media
 geet (song), a traditional Hindi or Urdu song
 Geet (1944 film)
 Geet (1970 film), a Bollywood film directed by Ramanand Sagar
 Geet (1992 film), a Bollywood film directed by Parto Ghosh 
 Geet (TV series) (Geet Hui Sabse Parayee), a Hindi-language soap opera airing in India

People 
 Geet (TikToker), a motivational speaker 
 Geet Chaturvedi, a Hindi poet and novelist
 Geet Sagar, the winner of India's inaugural season of X Factor (2011)
 Geet Sethi, a professional player of English billiards

See also 
 Geats, a North Germanic tribe